According to the Book of Mormon, Moronihah (1st century BC) was the son of Captain Moroni who had defeated the armies of Zerahemnah, stopped the king-men, and restored the Nephites' cities to their possession.  When Moroni got too old to lead an army any longer, Moronihah received command of his father's armies.

In the 39th year of the reign of the judges, or 53 BC, Moronihah had successfully defended the Nephites against dissenters; it was his first recorded victory over the enemies of the Nephites.  When the Nephite dissenter Coriantumr invaded a couple years later, however, Moronihah was taken by surprise as Coriantumr attacked the center of the land, Zarahmela, rather than the fortified borders. He then sent Lehi with an army to cut off the dissenters and the Lamanites, and Coriantumr was killed in the battle, along with many others.  Moronihah himself retook possession of Zarahemla, and set at liberty the Lamanite prisoners the Nephites had captured there.

Over the next decade, more Nephites dissented to the Lamanites and went to battle against the Nephites.  Because of their wickedness, the Nephites were unable to obtain all their cities back, although, with Moronihah's help, they were able to obtain half of them.  This he did by preaching repentance to the Nephites with Nephi and his brother Lehi, and then leading the repentant Nephites to regain their cities and possessions.  Moronihah could not get back more than half of the Nephites possessions, and thus gave up, turning instead to his plans of keeping the lands they were now in possession of.

See also
 Book of Helaman

References

External links
 Moronihah1 in the index of the Latter-day Saint Book of Mormon.

Book of Mormon people